The Northern American Triangle refers to the Central American countries of El Salvador, Guatemala, and Honduras.

Studies shows that the trend of unaccompanied migration from the Northern Triangle is strongly influenced by the poverty and violence of the sending countries. Given that these children are considered underage migrants, the manner in which the Department of Homeland Security and the United States in general receives them differs from that of adult migrants.

Background

Section 462 of the Homeland Security Act of 2002 defines an unaccompanied minor as a child who meets the following requirements:

"(A) has no lawful immigration status in the United States; (B) has not attained 18 years of age; and (C) with respect to whom— (i) there is no parent or legal guardian in the United States; or (ii) no parent or legal guardian in the United States is available to provide care and physical custody."

Between 2009 and 2014, U.S Customs and Border Protection saw a rise in the number of unaccompanied minors from the Northern Triangle being apprehended at the border; among these minors there was a 77% increase in girls and 117% increase children ages twelve and under. The Northern Triangle refers to the countries of El Salvador, Guatemala, and Honduras, which since the late 20th century have undergone a series of crises and civil wars which the United States has intervened in. There has been a 120% increase in the number of children from Honduras, more than 100% increase in the number of children from El Salvador, and almost a 60% increase in the child migrants from Guatemala who have crossed or tried to cross the U.S. border since 2013.

Individuals who research migration from countries in South America to the United States cite numerous push and pull factors varying from country to country. The surge in unaccompanied minors from the Northern Triangle is a result of violence, war, and poverty. Examples of this war and violence include the Guatemalan Genocide which resulted in 200,000 Maya individuals being killed or disappearing at the hands of the Guatemalan military after they were believed to support and hide guerrillas. In addition, many of the children flee gang recruitment which forces them to participate in wars against other gangs and police enforcement. The recruitment age for gangs is as low as 7 to 8 years old. Many children brought into gangs are torn away from their families or forced to partake in violent actions. There is also an increase in the migration of children from the Northern Triangle that correlates with the spike in homicide rates. The United Nations Office on Drugs and Crime reported that for every 100,000 people in Honduras, the homicide rate was 90.4. The homicide rate for El Salvador was 41.2 and Guatemala's was 39.9. Many children cite that this violence, in all of its forms is their primary reason for fleeing their home country.

Immigration laws

Children entering the United States illegally under the age of 18 are considered to be minors and are subject to the policies instituted for children entering the United States alone, without permission. The Homeland Security Act of 2002 gave two options for the detention of the unaccompanied children. The first is directed by the Department of Homeland Security and their responsibilities lie in transferring the children back to their home country. The other option functions under the Office of Refugee Resettlement (ORR) and they place the children in the foster care system. In 2006, 85% of the unaccompanied children found and placed into the hands of either the Department of Homeland Security or the Office of Refugee Resettlement were from countries in the Northern Triangle, including Guatemala, Honduras, and El Salvador. The process of the removal of unaccompanied minors in the United States is outlined in the Immigration and Nationality Act (INA). Under the INA, children with a criminal record or dangerous to society (deemed by the Department of Homeland Security) are often subject of expedited removal.  The children oftentimes face the process of the juvenile criminal justice system, rather than the civil procedure their crossing calls for. This includes their lack of legal representation in courts, with a frequent need for a translator that they do not often receive. 

The Flores Settlement Agreement, enacted in 1997, attempted to bring regulations regarding the treatment of unaccompanied children in custody under the INA. Beforehand, they were often subject to maltreatment from authorities that detained them without any type of protection. The Flores Settlement Agreement required officials to allow the Department of Homeland Security to handle the detention of the minors and place them in the system of the ORR. This might include family members or sponsors, or other provisions that have a standard of care.

There are four main types of U.S. immigration relief that unaccompanied children can receive. These four are asylum, Special Immigrant Juvenile Status, U visas and T visas. Asylum is an international protection granted to unaccompanied children who face and fear persecution of "race, religion, nationality, political opinion, or membership a particular social group." A migrant child with Special Immigrant Juvenile Status is a minor who experienced abandonment, neglect, or abuse from a parent or both parents. Unaccompanied children who qualify for a U visa are victims of particular crimes and whose experiences have left a negative physical or mental mark. The child migrants granted a T visa are victims of trafficking of critical forms who can prove that if returned to their country, they would suffer tremendously.

Relocation of the children
According to 2014 data, the most popular U.S regions that obtained unaccompanied children were Texas (7.4%), New York (5.8%), California (5.5%), and Florida (2.8%). All four of these regions contain shelter programs - Texas with 11, California with 5 and Florida with 2. Both Texas and Florida have a long-term foster care site and Texas has a transitional foster care program. In addition Florida also has a residential treatment center.

In regards to the custody option that some unaccompanied children are given, there are complications surrounding who the children are given to. Many are incorrectly assumed adult status. Many of the child migrants identify themselves with the age of 19, in the hopes of not being placed in their home country's child services if they are sent back. While the older age might protect them from that transfer, in the United States it calls for a different process. Most of the unaccompanied children entering the United States do not have an ID to confirm their age. If correctly determined to be a minor, some children are given to family members in the United States or to sponsors. Other children are placed in foster care systems.

Education of the children
In Plyer v. Doe, the U.S Supreme Court challenged Section 21.031 of the Texas Education Code which granted public schools in Texas the right to charge undocumented children tuition and even deny their admittance. It held that any child regardless of immigration status living within the United States' borders can enroll and attend K-12 public schools free of cost. This is limited to elementary, middle, and high school, and does not extend to higher education such as college. Plyer v. Doe is also only applicable to undocumented minors with either a guardian or a sponsor and excludes unaccompanied minors held by the Office of Refugee Resettlement.

The Reno v. Flores landmark case was an attempt to better the conditions within ORR detainment centers. Between 2009 and 2010 the average stay of an unaccompanied minor was 61 days. That is 61 days without attending a public school and socializing with other individuals. In 2014, the Office of Refugee Resettlement declared that they are required to provide unaccompanied minors educational services in a classroom setting from Monday to Friday. In these classrooms within the detainment facility, children are taught the essentials of science, math, writing, physical education, and social studies by a licensed teacher fluent in both English and Spanish. Although they are encouraged to work with local schools to develop a curriculum and enhance the educational experience of unaccompanied minors, the ORR rarely does so.

In the 2014 to 2015 school year, 50,000 unaccompanied minors were estimated to be attending public schools. Certain individuals do so while also having a full-time job. Schools in Oakland, California have also requested additional funding in order to provide unaccompanied minors with mental health and legal resources.

Children in the workforce
Being both undocumented and underage, unaccompanied minors who enter the workforce find employment in the secondary sector; that is, blue-collar jobs. Jobs in this segment are characterized for being labor-intensive, having low-wages, unpleasant working conditions, inconsistent schedules, few benefits, limited upward mobility, and being tenuous in that one can be fired at any time without affecting the employer. This includes jobs in the garment industry, hotel, restaurant, agricultural, child caring, vendor, and landscaping industry.

Unaccompanied minors from the Northern Triangle who enter this segment of the labor market are likely to face exploitation, yet they tolerate such conditions because many have families back in their sending countries that depend on their remittances. In 2012 the number of remittances immigrants sent to their respective sending countries amounted to $3.9 billion.

In Los Angeles, unaccompanied minors from the Northern Triangle find employment in L.A's garment industry. This industry is characterized by its poor working conditions which include wages being withheld, lack of ventilation, and long work schedules that prohibit minors from attending school during the day. Stephanie Canizales, a Ph.D. candidate at the University of Southern California, works with Guatemalan youth and reported that among the participants in her study the median weekly income was $350 for working 11 hours a day, 6 days a week.

Mental health of children 
Unaccompanied minors migrating to the United States from the Northern Triangle are considered hidden populations, a term applied to certain populations within society for which there is few observable data. In the case of unaccompanied minors, there is scarce scientific data because their illegal status can discourage their sponsors from participating in studies, and policies forbid researchers from interviewing unaccompanied children placed in shelters.

In "Pediatric Community Mental Health", doctors Cullins, Gabriel, Solages, Call, McKnight, Concepcion, and Cho make the point that the mental health of unaccompanied minors can be categorized into three distinct phases. The first is that of their mental health pre-departure, which can be poorly affected by the fact that many unaccompanied minors either lack a parental figure (as they may be working in the United States in order to provide) or witnessed the death of one. The second stage occurs during their journey in which traveling alone poses dangerous implications such as kidnapping, extortion, violence at the hands of gangs, and having to fend for themselves. In particular, unaccompanied girls often report experiencing rape and sexual assault traveling through Mexico. The third stage takes place after their arrival when unaccompanied minors must acculturate to the United States without the guidance of an adult such as a parent or legal representative. This can be detrimental to their mental health and also may involve struggling with the fear of being deported and the challenges of not knowing English.

Many unaccompanied migrant children endure traumatic events and violence in their home countries. The effects of those experiences take a toll on their mental health, shown in the higher rates of mental illnesses among refugee children. The anxiety and grief accumulated through those experiences, added with language barriers and difficulty in adapting to the new culture or environment, can make a child vulnerable and contribute to a poor mental state, causing a higher susceptibility to illnesses like post-traumatic stress disorder (PTSD) and depression. Drawn from a sample in a research study, the rates of PTSD among unaccompanied migrant minors from the Northern Triangle is 11.8%. Anxiety affected 54.4% of the children and 38.8% of the children showed symptoms of depression.

Although the Office of Refugee Resettlement is required to perform mental health screenings, according to the previously mentioned doctors, the process in which they do so has been questioned. Previous research performed on unaccompanied children abroad shows that children cope with anxiety, post traumatic stress disorders, trouble sleeping and eating, and on rare occasions self-harming behavior.

References

Refugees in the United States
Child refugees
Northern Triangle refugee crisis
Child welfare in the United States
Latin American history